Newton-Conover City Schools is a school district located in Catawba County, North Carolina that serves the cities of Newton and Conover.

As of 2021 the district schools has a total of around 2,888 students on roll, and 188 teachers.

Schools 
The Newton-Conover school system is made up of seven schools:

Elementary schools 

 Shuford Elementary School
 North Newton Elementary School
 South Newton Elementary 
 Conover School

Middle schools 

 Newton-Conover Middle School

High schools 

 Newton-Conover High School
 Discovery High School of Newton-Conover

References

External links 
 

School districts in North Carolina